Moolchand was a prolific character actor in Hindi and Panjabi cinema, who was active from 1950 to his death in the late 1980s. He appeared in over 250 films. These films spanned the parallel cinema of Guru Dutt to the wrestler films of Dara Singh. He is known for his big stomach.

The first known appearance of Moolchand is in 1950. He was often featured in the films of the directors Guru Dutt and Raj Kapoor, working on 6 of the former and 8 of the latter. Other actors he was often seen with were Dev Anand, B. R. Chopra, Dara Singh and I. S. Johar, who featured him in most of their movies.

Most of Moolchand's early roles were small ones. He only began to get significant roles in the 1960s. Padosan (1968), where he plays the servant of Om Prakash's character featured a lot of close-ups of Moolchand and showed him to be an able comedic side actor. This comedic side would be further explored in the 1970s with a scene stealing appearance in Yaadon Ki Baarat, with fellow fat man Ram Avtar as a tortured businessman and in Don, as the village medicine man who dances with Amitabh and beckons Zeenat Aman to participate.

Little is known about Moolchand outside of his film work. The 1988 release Tamacha credits him as "Late Moolchand".

Movies

Khandaan (1942) as riding bicycles behind Noor Jehen's carFighting Hero (1946)Kismatwali (1947)Apna Desh(1949)Shri Ganesh Mahima (1950) Teen Batti Char Raasta (1953)
 Naata (1955)
Chhoti Bahen (1959)
 Chambe Di Kali (1960) punjabi movie 
 Mama Ji (1964) Punjabi Movie Jagga (1963) Punjabi Movie In Daku Gangs Nanak Dukhiya Sub Sansar (1970) as Bhola Ram
Amar Prem (1972) as Pan Shop Owner 
Yaadon Ki Baraat (1973)
 Loafer (1973) as constable Lalchand Dukh Bhanjan Tera Naam (1974) (Punjabi film)Patthar Aur Payal (1974) as Casino Card player/customer Ponga Pandit (1975)Pratigya (1975 film)Do Jasoos (1975) as Dancer in New Year partySalaakhen (1975) Phool aur Insaan (1976)Hera Pheri (1976)Chacha Bhatija (1977) as Grocery and Ration Shop OwnerAmar Akbar Anthony (1977) as PedroTrishul (1978) as Creditor
Don (1978 film) as GovindaPremi Gangaram as Chaat Ram
Nalayak (1978) as Customer in Casino
Gol Maal (1979) as Spectator in Cinema Hall
Suhaag (1979 film)
Khud-Daar (1982) as Small time smuggler
Maati Maangey Khoon (1984) as Jeweller
Adhikar (1986 film)
 Goraa (1987) as Seth Amirchand
Sadak Chhap as jewelr
Zakhmi Aurat (1988)
Mar Mitenge (1988) as Jeweller 
Hum Intezaar Karenge (1989) as Sethji
Toofan (1989 film) as Seth Dharamdas

References

External links
 

Indian male film actors
Male actors in Hindi cinema
Indian male comedians
Male actors in Punjabi cinema
20th-century Indian male actors
1980s deaths
Year of birth missing